= Adhesive weight =

Weight on the driving wheels of a train

Adhesive weight is the weight on the driving wheels of a locomotive, which determines the frictional grip between wheels and rail, and hence the drawbar pull which a locomotive can exert.

== See also ==
- Factor of adhesion
- Tractive effort
